EduSAT is an Italian microsatellite which was launched in August 2011. The satellite was built and is operated by the Sapienza University of Rome in conjunction with the Italian Space Agency ASI, and is primarily used for educational outreach and technology demonstration.

The spacecraft is powered by surface-mounted solar cells. It carries an experimental analogue sun sensor, a magnetometer and a temperature sensor. The satellite also tested a prototype PocketQube deployer and a passive deorbit mechanism. As of September 2013 it remained operational.

EduSAT was launched aboard a Dnepr carrier rocket from Site 370/13 at the Dombarovsky launch site in Russia. The launch was conducted by Kosmotras with liftoff occurring at 07:12:20 on 17 August 2011. The rocket carried six other satellites, with an additional payload bolted to the upper stage. The satellite was placed into a sun-synchronous low Earth orbit.

References

Spacecraft launched in 2011
Student satellites
Satellites of Italy
Sapienza University of Rome
Spacecraft launched by Dnepr rockets